René Jacques Guissart (12 September 1929 – 8 September 2014) was a French rower who competed in the 1952 Summer Olympics and in the 1956 Summer Olympics. In 1952 he and his partner Jean-Pierre Souche finished fifth in the coxless pair event. Four years later he won the bronze medal with the French boat in the coxless fours event.

References

External links
 René Guissart's profile at Sports Reference.com

1929 births
2014 deaths
French male rowers
Olympic rowers of France
Rowers at the 1952 Summer Olympics
Rowers at the 1956 Summer Olympics
Olympic bronze medalists for France
Olympic medalists in rowing
Medalists at the 1956 Summer Olympics
20th-century French people